Lynden David Hall (7 May 1974 – 14 February 2006) was an English singer, songwriter, arranger, and record producer who emerged during the late 1990s as part of the neo soul movement. In 1999, he was the first UK performer ever voted "Best Male Artist" by the readers of Britain's Blues & Soul magazine. His debut album, Medicine 4 My Pain, as well as the singles "Do I Qualify" and "Sexy Cinderella", had an instant appeal to soul fans in the UK and elsewhere, but it was not until his work got remixed that he got his major breakthrough. In October 2003, Hall was diagnosed with Hodgkin's lymphoma; he died on 14 February 2006, at the age of 31, from complications resulting from the stem cell transplant he received in January 2005.

Life and career
Born in Wandsworth, South London, he won the "best newcomer" accolade at the 1998 MOBO (Music of Black Origin) Awards.

In 1999, he was the first UK performer ever voted "Best Male Artist" by the readers of Britain's Blues & Soul magazine. His debut album, Medicine 4 My Pain, as well as the singles "Do I Qualify" and "Sexy Cinderella", had an instant appeal to soul fans in the UK and elsewhere, but it was not until his work got remixed that he got his major breakthrough.

Hall appeared in the film Love Actually in 2003 as the lead singer of the surprise band that plays the Beatles' "All You Need Is Love" at the wedding of the characters played by Keira Knightley and Chiwetel Ejiofor. Two years later, he released his third studio album, In Between Jobs, on the independent record label Random Records.

In October 2003, Hall was diagnosed with Hodgkin's lymphoma; he died on 14 February 2006, at the age of 31, from complications resulting from the stem cell transplant he received in January 2005. Hall was in remission at the time of his death. Hall is survived by his wife Nikkie Hall, his parents  and sister Syreeta Hall.

Shortly before he died, while in hospital in November 2005, Hall and his wife achieved their wish to help others suffering by putting on the successful Lynden's Wish concert at London's Jazz Café.

Discography

Albums
 1997: Medicine 4 My Pain – UK No. 43
 2000: The Other Side – UK No. 36
 2005: In Between Jobs - UK No. 188

Singles

Films
 2003: Love Actually

References

External links
 
 
 
 Lynden David Hall interview by Pete Lewis, Blues & Soul magazine. May 2000 (reprinted April 2008).

1974 births
2006 deaths
Deaths from Hodgkin lymphoma
People from Wandsworth
20th-century Black British male singers
21st-century Black British male singers
People educated at the BRIT School
British contemporary R&B singers
English soul musicians
Neo soul singers
English people of Igbo descent